Roses Bloom on the Moorland is a 1952 West German drama film directed by Hans H. König and starring Ruth Niehaus, Hermann Schomberg and Armin Dahlen. It is also known in English by the alternative titles Rape on the Moor and Roses Bloom on the Grave in the Heather.

The film's sets were designed by Max Mellin. The film was shot on moorlands in the vicinity of Bremen. It is notable amongst post-war heimatfilm for its gloomy, gothic atmosphere.

Synopsis
In a German village a peasant girl is pressured by her family to marry a wealthy farmer, although she is in love with her childhood sweetheart who has recently returned from the city. Her fiancée tries to rape her on the moorland, echoing a similar tragedy that took place on the same spot hundreds of years ago during the Thirty Years War when a Swedish soldier attacked a local woman.

Cast
 Ruth Niehaus as Dorothee Aden
 Hermann Schomberg as Dietrich Eschmann
 Armin Dahlen as Ludwig Amelung, Architekt
 Gisela von Collande as Fiete, Eschmanns Magd
 Lotte Brackebusch as Sophie Amelung
 Hilde Körber as Friederike Aden
 Hedwig Wangel as Kräuterjule
 Ingeborg Morawski as Gesine, Magd bei Adens
 Albert Florath as Stallmacher, Wirt
 Ernst Waldow as Albert Berndsen, Handelsvertreter
 Walter Ladengast as Fromann, ein alter Schäfer
 Otto Friebel as Heini Schütt, Verkäufer
 Konrad Mayerhoff as Wilhelm Aden
 Anderl Kern
 Josef Dahmen as Der schwedische Leutnant
 Fred Berthold

References

Bibliography 
 Maggie Hoffgen. Studying German Cinema. Columbia University Press, 2009.
 Alexandra Ludewig. Screening Nostalgia: 100 Years of German Heimat Film. Transcript, 2014.

External links 
 

1952 films
West German films
German drama films
1952 drama films
1950s German-language films
Films directed by Hans H. König
German black-and-white films
1950s German films